Raymond Luedeke (born 1944) is an American / Canadian composer of contemporary classical music. Praised for his idiosyncratic instrumental writing and for his orchestration, Luedeke has more recently concentrated on works for music theatre. Although born in New York City, he spent 29 years as Associate Principal Clarinet with the Toronto Symphony Orchestra, a position he left in 2010. A dual citizen of the United States and Canada, Ray Luedeke is artistic director of Voice Afire Opera-Cabaret in New York City.

Biography
Son of Otto Luedeke, an officer in the US Army and a competitor in the 1932 Los Angeles Summer Olympic Games, Raymond Luedeke had a peripatetic childhood. Between the ages of 5 and 8, he lived in Japan. He alludes that his first concert of classical music was heard in Tokyo and that the music was Japanese classical music. He began piano lessons in Japan but did not continue this until the family was living in Massachusetts, where he took up the clarinet at the age of nine. He was soon composing his first pieces, something he continued when the family moved to New Jersey.

In 1966 Luedeke received his bachelor's degree from the Eastman School of Music, majoring in Music History. The following year he attended the University of Music and Performing Arts Vienna, on a Fulbright Grant, studying composition and clarinet. From 1967 to 1971 Ray Luedeke was a member of the United States Air Force Band, these being the years of the Vietnam War and the draft. While in Washington, D.C., he studied orchestration with Lawrence T. Odom (arranger and harpist with the USAF Band), wrote and arranged music for the Band, and received his M. Music in composition from The Catholic University of America. Later, he would study with George Crumb at Dartmouth and receive his Doctor of Musical Arts degree in composition from Northwestern University, where he studied with Alan Stout.

From 1971 to19 74,  Luedeke taught at The University of Wisconsin / Stevens Point, from 1974 to 1976 at Northwestern University, and from 1976 to 1981 at University of Missouri-Kansas City. While at Northwestern he was co-founder of The Twittering Machine, a contemporary music ensemble based at the Chicago Museum of Contemporary Art. In Kansas City he was conductor of The Kansas City Civic Orchestra and of the UMKC student orchestra and director of The Kansas City Contemporary Players

From 1981 until 2010 Raymond Luedeke was Associate Principal Clarinet of the Toronto Symphony.
While in that position, he won a Canada wide contest to compose an orchestral fanfare that would open Roy Thomson Hall, since 1982 the home of the TSO. He would later receive numerous grants from Canadian Arts Coumcils, (Canada Council for the Arts, Laidlaw Foundation, Ontario Arts Council, Toronto Arts Council)

The Music
The music of Ray Luedeke, along with traditional elements, incorporates a variety of the techniques of 20th and 21st Century music, including metric modulation, extended or ambiguous tonality, spatial notation, and the harmonic use of pitch sets.  A good deal of his music is inspired by poetry, particularly that of Pablo Neruda and of William Carlos Williams. Some of his music includes references to the music of non-Western cultures, to Japanese classical music, to African drumming, and to the Indonesian gamelan.

In Kevin Vigil's doctoral thesis on the guitar music of Raymond Luedeke, the composer is asked if he has had style periods, given the variety of forms found in his music: He replies that his style is to be found in his musical line and in his personal concept of counterpoint, rather than in his musical vocabulary, which may vary. He compares his music to poetry, in which metaphors may be interpreted in various ways. He does not accept the concept of absolute music, of music that only refers to itself. Without being programmatic, his music has a narrative that can suggest a variety of interpretations.

Partial list of compositions
Operas and music theater
My Life with Pablo Neruda – opera-cabaret in 4 acts 
Butterfly's Trouble – opera cabaret based on Puccini's Madama Butterfly                                                        
Wild Flowers – opera in 2 acts based on Iron Hans  (The Brothers Grimm)
The Magical Singing Drum – opera-cabaret based on an African story 
The Art of Love / Into the Labyrinth for 2 pianos and actor (Ovid Ars Amatoria and other works)
Kafka Shorts – music theatre for string quartet and 2 actors**In Kharms Way – music theatre for string quartet and 2 actors
Garbage Delight – music theatre for saxophone quintet with narration
Wonderland Duets for 2 tubas and narrator (Lewis Carroll)
Orchestra 
Circus Music
Ah, Matsushima!
The Transparency of Time for piano and orchestra                                             
Concerto for Double Bass 
Concerto for Violin 
The North Wind's Gift 
Tales of the Netsilik – for narrator and orchestra
Clockworks
Shadow Music
Fanfare for 12 herald trumpets and large orchestra
Concerto for Saxophone Quartet  
4 Cantos
Chamber Orchestra                              
Hard Right 
In This World for string orch., flute, and marimba                                                                
Little Rose 
Chamber Symphony
Chorus
Love is the every only god – on poems by e. e. cummings
In Just Spring for Children’s Chorus – on poems by e. e. cummings
Prayers, Poems, and Incantations for the Earth for chorus and children’s chorus
Disasters of the Sun for gamelan and chamber chorus – poems by Dorothy Livesay
A Prayer for the Earth for chorus and orchestra 
Four Songs, The Dream and Old Song – on poems by Dorothy Livesay
Of Him I Love for chorus SATB,  Saxophone Quartet, double bass, percussion
Vocal Solo 
Livesay Songs for soprano and piano – on poems by Dorothy Livesay
Whispers of Heavenly Death for 2 sopranos and piano – poems by Walt Whitman
Pictures from Breughel – for soprano, baritone, WW Quintet – William Carlos Williams
New Hampshire and His Majesty the Tuba  for tuba, tenor and piano
Large Ensemble
The Winds of Her Misfortune for orchestra brass, woodwind, and perc. sections
In This World for string orchestra and marimba
Circus Music for brass band
Cathedrals for brass ensemble
Echoland for mixed ensemble
Soundscapes for concert band 
Krishna for tuba (or piano) and percussion
Rondo for trumpet and band
Chamber Music
Ysaye Does It for 4 violins
Questions for flute, viola, double bass, and narrator
Tango Dreams for string trio and accordion
Brother Jack for vln., E. Hn., harpsichord
Ceremonial Dances for piano and string quartet
The Moon in the Labyrinth for harp and string quartet
The Lyre of Orpheus for harp and string quartet (or 2 Harps) 
Elemental Dances for guitar and string quartet
String Quartet – inspired by a poem of William Carlos Williams
Nocturnal Variations for woodwind quintet**Serenade for oboe, cello and piano
Serenade for oboe, cello and piano
Little Suite for 3 horns
Macchu Picchu for flute (alto flute), clarinet (Bb, A, Eb), violin and piano
Quintet for Brass / Complexity and Contradiction 
Mystery Madrigals for flute (piccolo), clarinet (Bb, A, Eb), violin, cello and perc.
Divertimenti 1 and 2 for 2 clarinets and bassoon
From the Mountain Top for trombone quartet
Joy, fanfare for brass quintet
Duos
Fancies and Interludes I for tuba and piano
Fancies and Interludes II for alto sax. and piano 
Fancies and Interludes III for horn and percussion 
Fancies and Interludes IV for bass clarinet and percussion 
Fancies and Interludes V for cello and organ 
Fancies and Interludes VI for violin and piano 
Fancies and Interludes VII for bassoon and piano
Ah, Matsushima! for violin and marimba with narration (Japanese haiku) 
Paprika for bassoon and cello 
If You Forget Me for cello (or viola) and piano
Sonata for viola and piano 
In This World for flute (or violin or clarinet) and marimba  **In the Eye of the Cat for flute (or violin) and guitar 
In the Eye of the Cat for flute (or violin) and guitar 
Brief Encounters for viola and piano 
Serenity for clarinet (or soprano saxophone) and accordion
Fairy Tales for flute and harp 
Silence! for percussion and oboe (or flute or clarinet or viola or cello or voice)
Body Language for 2 percussion 
Aurora for flute and harp 
Duo for oboe and cello 
Horn Calls for 2 horns 
15 Inventions for 2 clarinets 
8 Bagatelles for 2 Tubas
Solo
Grief for solo cello
Tango Dreams for piano
My Secret Life for viola 
12 Preludes for piano 
5 Preludes for guitar 
Fantasy for piano
Arrangements
Gipsy Songs (Dvorak) for woodwind quintet
Ragtime (various composers) for woodwind quintet
Le Tombeau de Couperin (Ravel) for oboe (or clarinet), violin, cello, and accordion
Carnival of Venice for clarinet and orchestra (clarinet part by Paul JeanJean)
The Heart and Soul of Tango, 9  tangos for string trio, accordion, and bs-baritone
Amazing Grace for orchestra, bagpipes, and student violins
The Blue Danube (J. Strauss) for clarinet and string quartet 
First Clarinet Concerto for solo clarinet and wind ens. (Carl Maria von Weber) 
Four Nocturnes (Poulenc) for string orchestra

References

External links
Official home page
Luedeke's bio from The American Composers Alliance
 Luedeke's bio from The Canadian Music Centre
Luedeke's bio from The Archives of the University of Maryland
Luedeke's bio from The Canadian Who’s Who
Raymond Luedeke Youtube website
Facebook Page for Voice Afire Opera-Cabaret
Facebook Page for My Life with Pablo Neruda 
Facebook Page for Ray Luedeke

Further Reference
Suppan, Armin Suppan: ‘’Das Neue Lexikon des Blasmusikwesens’’, 4. Auflage, Freiburg-Tiengen, Blasmusikverlag Schulz GmbH, 1994, 
Paul E. Bierley, William H. Rehrig: ‘’The heritage encyclopedia of band music : composers and their music’’, Westerville, Ohio: Integrity Press, 1991, 
Carolyn Beatty, Mark Hand, Simone Auer, Ned Bouhalassa, Mireille Gagne, Gilles Marois, Veronique Robert: ‘’Repertoire des compositeurs’’, Toronto: Centre de Musique Canadiene, 1989.
Londeix, Jean-Marie: ‘’Musique pour saxophone, volume II : répertoire général des oeuvres et des ouvrages d' enseignement pour le saxophone’’, Cherry Hill: Roncorp Publications, 1985.
Anderson, E. Ruth: ‘’Contemporary American composers - A biographical dictionary, Second edition’’, Boston: G. K. Hall, 1982, 578 p., 

Eastman School of Music alumni
Northwestern University alumni
University of Wisconsin–Madison faculty
University of Missouri faculty
American classical composers
1944 births
20th-century classical composers
21st-century classical composers
Composers for piano
American male classical composers
Living people
21st-century American composers
20th-century American composers
20th-century American male musicians
21st-century American male musicians